Miguel Alberto Cortijo (born August 22, 1958 in La Banda, Santiago del Estero) is a retired Argentine basketball player. He spent his mostly career at Ferro Carril Oeste, the club where he won 4 local titles. Cortijo is considered one of the best point guards in Argentine basketball history.

Career
Cortijo started his career at Club INTI of Santiago del Estero, playing in youth categories. He would be later drafted by León Najnudel (considered "the father" of the Liga Nacional de Básquet) who was coaching Ferro Carril Oeste at that time. Cortijo was only 18 when he was incorporated by Ferro where he spent most of his career, playing 14 consecutive years for the club. With Cortijo in the team, Ferro Carril Oeste won the 1980 Metropolitano championship and the Campeonato Sudamericano de Clubes in 1981 and 1982.

In 1984 the Liga Nacional was created and Ferro won the 1985 and 1986 championships. The team also was the 1987 runner-up losing the finals against Atenas de Córdoba of Marcelo Milanesio and Héctor Campana. Cortijo continued playing for Ferro until 1990, where the club achieved a new Liga championship (in 1989, being coached by his mentor Najnudel) and the Campeonato Sudamericano de Clubes in 1986.

Cortijo was signed by Peñarol de Mar del Plata where he spent a year after returning to Ferro where he played another season. He then played in Club Olímpico (from his home town, La Banda) and then was signed by Boca Juniors for the 1993-94 season, where he met León Najnudel again, although the team did not win any title. In 1994 Cortijo played for Siderca (located in the city of Campana, Buenos Aires Province). His next team was Independiente of General Pico, La Pampa, where he won a new Sudamericano de Clubes championship although the team would be defeated by Boca Juniors at the Liga Nacional finals. Cortijo ended his career playing for Regatas Corrientes in 1998.

Honours and awards

Clubs
Domestic
 Campeonato Argentino (1): 1980
 Liga Nacional de Básquet (3): 1985, 1986, 1989
International
 Campeonato Sudamericano (4): 1981, 1982, 1987, 1996 
 Torneo Federación de Buenos Aires (3): 1980, 1982, 1983

National team
 Bronce Medal (Torneo de las Américas, Pre-Olympic Games) (1): 1980
 Gold Medal (Campeonato Sudamericano) (1): 1987

Individual
 Olimpia de Plata (4): 1980, 1981, 1986, 1987
 Konex Award (1): 1990
 Konex Foundation (Certificate of Distinction) (1): 1990 
 Number 11 retired by Quimsa

Statistics
 396 matches played at the Liga Nacional
 4,201 points scored at the Liga Nacional (10,6 pts. per game)

Notes

References

External links
Interview to Miguel Cortijo 

1958 births
Living people
Argentine men's basketball players
1990 FIBA World Championship players
Boca Juniors basketball players
Ferro Carril Oeste basketball players
Independiente de General Pico basketball players
Peñarol de Mar del Plata basketball players
People from La Banda
Point guards
Regatas Corrientes basketball players
1986 FIBA World Championship players
Sportspeople from Santiago del Estero Province